This is a list of people elected Fellow of the Royal Society in 1945.
This includes the first two female fellows: Kathleen Lonsdale and Marjory Stephenson.

Fellows 
John Anderson, 1st Viscount Waverley
Leonard Colebrook
Sir William Scott Farren
Norman Feather
Sir John Henry Gaddum
Sir Harry Godwin
John Masson Gulland
Hildebrand Wolfe Harvey
Vincent Charles Illing
Albert Edward Ingham
Herbert Davenport Kay
Wilfrid Bennett Lewis
Dame Kathleen Yardley Lonsdale
Prasanta Chandra Mahalanobis
Sir Rudolf Ernst Peierls
John Monteath Robertson
Frederick Maurice Rowe
Sir William Wright Smith
Marjory Stephenson
Sir Barnes Neville Wallis
John Zachary Young

1945
1945 in science
1945 in the United Kingdom